Normandie Avenue is one of Los Angeles County's longest north–south streets, with a stretch of about . It lies between Western Avenue to the west and Vermont Avenue to the east. The avenue begins in the south by branching off from Vermont Avenue south of Pacific Coast Highway in Harbor City. Through traffic on Normandie is directed onto Irolo Street between just north of Olympic Boulevard and Wilshire Boulevard; in this section, Normandie exists as a small residential street. After crossing Franklin Avenue, Normandie resumes as a residential street before reaching its northern terminus at Ambrose Avenue in the Los Feliz district of Los Angeles.

History
Normandie was originally named Rosedale Avenue until 1900. The intersection of Florence and Normandie is noted for 1992 Los Angeles riots.  

The street has since been redeveloped.

Transportation
Metro Local line: 206 and Gardena Transit line 2 operate on Normandie Avenue: Metro Local Line 206 runs between Hollywood Boulevard and Imperial Highway and Gardena line 2 between 182nd Street and Pacific Coast Highway.

A subway station is served by the Metro D Line at its intersection with Wilshire Boulevard.

Notable landmarks
 Harbor-UCLA Medical Center
 Gardena High School
 Hotel Normandie
 Rosedale Cemetery
 Sammy Lee Square, at the corner of Olympic Boulevard

References

Streets in Los Angeles
Streets in Los Angeles County, California
Central Los Angeles
South Los Angeles